Skenderija is a cultural, sports and trade center located in Sarajevo, Bosnia and Herzegovina. In the area of 70,000 square meters there are multipurpose halls for various sports, concert and cultural venues, and trade areas above ground including square. Underground is a modern shopping center "Privredni grad" (English: Commercial City) with numerous confectionery shops, restaurants, coffee bars and other spaces. Skenderija consists of several venues which include: Dom Mladih, Ars Aevi and Mirza Delibašić Hall.

History 

Due to a lack of an exhibition and sports-centre within the fast expanding city of Sarajevo of the late 1960s, the city-community planned to build the new Skenderija-centre. It was opened on 29 November 1969 by hosting a première of the film Battle of Neretva.

The name Skenderija, which means "Skender's place", comes from the famous Bosnian bey Sandžak-beg Skender-paša, who build the first trading-centre with 11 shops and the first Muslim monastery of Bosnia from 1499. Soon the Skenderija was a well known and widely used centre for several cultural events of the former Yugoslavia. One part of the Skenderija is a youth club called "Dom mladih" (The Youth House). Before the Bosnian War of the 1990s, this was one of the modernist and most western styled clubs of Yugoslavia. It was a very popular place among young people, and big stars of Balkan pop-music, such as Dino Merlin, had started their careers here. Also a biggest mall at the former country was is included in the centre, called "Privredni grad".

In 1977, when Sarajevo won the bid process to host the 1984 Winter Olympics.The local Organizing Committee chose the center to be the auxiliary venue, but the venues was outdated and they started to reconstruct and expand the Skenderija turning the complex a real state-of-the-art sporting complex. It was also chosen as media center and awarding ceremonies venue.

In 1992, when the war in Bosnia and Herzegovina started, the Skenderija was set under shell-fire. The main structure of the building survived without major damage, but the youth-centre was burned out and made unusable.

After the war, there was no need for the centre and it slowly went into disrepair. But in 1999, the city-government of Sarajevo wished to have an exhibition-hall to build up a new economy and trade in Bosnia and Herzegovina. So they rebuilt the Skenderija slowly between 2000–06. It was financed by many private companies, so it is under the ownership of these private bodies. However it now has all of the old functions restored and is back in service today. It is estimated to have over 500,000 visitors each year.

On 12 February 2012 the Ice hall centre's roof collapsed under the weight of heavy snow fall. The roof was designed to sustain to 100 kg per square meter, while the weight of snow was about 160 kg per square meter.

References

External links
 Official website

Venues of the 1984 Winter Olympics
Olympic figure skating venues
Olympic ice hockey venues
Neighbourhoods in Grad Sarajevo
Centar, Sarajevo
Sports venues completed in 1969
1969 establishments in Yugoslavia
Indoor ice hockey venues in Bosnia and Herzegovina
Subterranean structures in Bosnia and Herzegovina
Buildings and structures in Sarajevo
Underground cities